Alexander Stuart Douglas FRSE FRCP  (1921–1998) was  a physician and haematologist. He was Regius Professor of Medicine at Aberdeen University from 1970 to 1985.

He received international acclaim for his discoveries in relation to blood coagulation, causes of abnormal bleeding, and causes of thrombosis. He played a key role in identifying the role of anticoagulants and antiplatelet agents in preventing heart attacks, setting a modern benchmark for the treatment of heart disease.

He was one of the two people in 1951 establishing that Haemophilia split into two groups: isolating what is now commonly called Haemophilia B, then known as Christmas disease after its first known host, Stephen Christmas.

Life

He was born in Elgin in northern Scotland on 2 October 1921 and was the son of Robert Douglas (1871–1948), a crofter.  He was educated at Elgin Academy. He studied Medicine at Glasgow University graduating BSc in 1941. In 1944 Glasgow University granted him MB ChB.

From 1945 to 1948 he served as a Major in the Royal Army Medical Corps in the post-war re-establishment of Palestine and was Mentioned in Dispatches.

After this period he worked in the Blood Coagulation Research Unit in Oxford with Robert Gwyn Macfarlane. Jointly they isolated and identified the condition now known as Haemophilia B, but then known as Christmas Disease after its first identified sufferer, Stephen Christmas.

From 1953 he was a lecturer in Medicine at Glasgow University. In 1965 he was seconded to Nairobi University. In 1970 he was awarded the chair in Medicine at Aberdeen University.

In 1993, in his old age, he was elected a Fellow of the Royal Society of Edinburgh. His proposers were Prof John Mallard, S C Frazer, Prof E M McGirr, H M Keir, Prof John Anderson Strong, Prof Hans Kosterlitz, I A McGregor, and F W Robertson.

He died on 15 November 1998.

Family

His wife was Christina and they had one son and one daughter.

Publications

Seasonal Variation in Health and Diseases (1994)

References

1921 births
1998 deaths
People from Elgin, Moray
Alumni of the University of Glasgow
Academics of the University of Aberdeen
Fellows of the Royal Society of Edinburgh
People associated with Aberdeen
20th-century Scottish medical doctors
Scottish medical writers
Regius Professors of Medicine (Aberdeen)
Fellows of the Royal College of Physicians of Edinburgh
Fellows of the Royal College of Physicians